Fédération nationale des boulangers et pâtissiers du Burkina (FNBPB) is a trade union of bakery workers in Burkina Faso. The union was founded on April 4, 1960. FNBPB is affiliated to Confédération générale du travail du Burkina (CGT-B). Djigimdé Tiga is the president of FNBPB.

FNBPB is a member of the International Union of Food, Agricultural, Hotel, Restaurant, Catering, Tobacco and Allied Workers' Association.

References

Trade unions in Burkina Faso
Baking industry
Trade unions established in 1960
Food processing trade unions